Monique Barbut, born in 1956 in Morocco, is a French public servant who served as the Executive Secretary of the United Nations Convention to Combat Desertification (UNCCD) from 2013 until 2019. She was appointed to this position by the United Nations Secretary-General Ban Ki-moon on 16 September 2013.

Biography 
Barbut obtained her Master of Philosophy in Economics and Bachelor of Arts in English from the University of Paris.

Due to her role in the French government in the 1992 Earth Summit and the establishment of the French Global Environment Facility, Barbut became the first Chief Executive Officer of the French GEF. She subsequently held a number of high-ranking positions, including Chief Executive Officer and Chairperson of GEF (2006-2012) and Director of the Division of Technology, Industry and Economics at the United Nations Environment Programme (2003-2006).

Later in her career, Barbut served as the Special Adviser to the Chief Executive Officer of the Agence Française pour le Développement (AFD) from 2012 to 2013. In 2019, she was a member of the “High-Level Group of Wise Persons” appointed by the Council of the European Union and charged with drafting recommendations on how to reform existing financial instruments for sustainable development managed by the European Commission, the European Investment Bank (EIB) and the European Bank for Reconstruction and Development (EBRD).

Other activities
 International Gender Champions (IGC), Member

References

Living people
French politicians
University of Paris alumni
Year of birth missing (living people)
Moroccan emigrants to France